The respiratory quotient (RQ or respiratory coefficient) is a dimensionless number used in calculations of basal metabolic rate (BMR) when estimated from carbon dioxide production. It is calculated from the ratio of carbon dioxide produced by the body to oxygen consumed by the body. Such measurements, like measurements of oxygen uptake, are forms of indirect calorimetry. It is measured using a respirometer. The respiratory quotient value indicates which macronutrients are being metabolized, as different energy pathways are used for fats, carbohydrates, and proteins. If metabolism consists solely of lipids, the respiratory quotient is approximately 0.7, for proteins it is approximately 0.8, and for carbohydrates it is 1.0. Most of the time, however, energy consumption is composed of both fats and carbohydrates. The approximate respiratory quotient of a mixed diet is 0.8. Some of the other factors that may affect the respiratory quotient are energy balance, circulating insulin, and insulin sensitivity.

It can be used in the alveolar gas equation.

Calculation
The respiratory quotient (RQ) is the ratio:

RQ = CO2 eliminated / O2 consumed

where the term "eliminated" refers to carbon dioxide (CO2) removed from the body.

In this calculation, the CO2 and O2 must be given in the same units, and in quantities proportional to the number of molecules. Acceptable inputs would be either moles, or else volumes of gas at standard temperature and pressure.

Many metabolized substances are compounds containing only the elements carbon, hydrogen, and oxygen. Examples include fatty acids, glycerol, carbohydrates, deamination products, and ethanol. For complete oxidation of such compounds, the chemical equation is

CxHyOz + (x + y/4 - z/2) O2 
→ x CO2 + (y/2) H2O

and thus metabolism of this compound gives an RQ of x/(x + y/4 - z/2).

For glucose, with the molecular formula, C6H12O6, the complete oxidation equation is C6H12O6 + 6 O2 
→ 6 CO2+ 6 H2O. Thus, the RQ= 6 CO2/ 6 O2=1.

For fats, the RQ depends on the specific fatty acids present.  Amongst the commonly stored fatty acids in vertebrates, RQ varies from 0.692 (stearic acid) to as high as 0.759 (docosahexaenoic acid).  Historically, it was assumed that 'average fat' had an RQ of about 0.71, and this holds true for most mammals including humans.  However, a recent survey showed that aquatic animals, especially fish, have fat that should yield higher RQs on oxidation, reaching as high as 0.73 due to high amounts of docosahexaenoic acid.

The range of respiratory coefficients for organisms in metabolic balance usually ranges from 1.0 (representing the value expected for pure carbohydrate oxidation) to ~0.7 (the value expected for pure fat oxidation). In general, molecules that are more oxidized (e.g., glucose) require less oxygen to be fully metabolized and, therefore, have higher respiratory quotients. Conversely, molecules that are less oxidized (e.g., fatty acids) require more oxygen for their complete metabolism and have lower respiratory quotients. See BMR for a discussion of how these numbers are derived. A mixed diet of fat and carbohydrate results in an average value between these numbers.

RQ value corresponds to a caloric value for each liter (L) of CO2 produced. If O2 consumption numbers are available, they are usually used directly, since they are more direct and reliable estimates of energy production.

RQ as measured includes a contribution from the energy produced from protein. However, due to the complexity of the various ways in which different amino acids can be metabolized, no single RQ can be assigned to the oxidation of protein in the diet.

Insulin, which increases lipid storage and decreases fat oxidation, is positively associated with increases in the respiratory quotient. A positive energy balance will also lead to an increased respiratory quotient.

Applications 
Practical applications of the respiratory quotient can be found in severe cases of chronic obstructive pulmonary disease, in which patients spend a significant amount of energy on respiratory effort. By increasing the proportion of fats in the diet, the respiratory quotient is driven down, causing a relative decrease in the amount of CO2 produced. This reduces the respiratory burden to eliminate CO2, thereby reducing the amount of energy spent on respirations.

Respiratory Quotient can be used as an indicator of over or underfeeding. Underfeeding, which forces the body to utilize fat stores, will lower the respiratory quotient, while overfeeding, which causes lipogenesis, will increase it. Underfeeding is marked by a respiratory quotient below 0.85, while a respiratory quotient greater than 1.0 indicates overfeeding. This is particularly important in patients with compromised respiratory systems, as an increased respiratory quotient significantly corresponds to increased respiratory rate and decreased tidal volume, placing compromised patients at a significant risk.

Because of its role in metabolism, respiratory quotient can be used in analysis of liver function and diagnosis of liver disease. In patients with liver cirrhosis, non-protein respiratory quotient (npRQ) values act as good indicators in the prediction of overall survival rate. Patients having a npRQ < 0.85 show considerably lower survival rates as compared to patients with a npRQ > 0.85. A decrease in npRQ corresponds to a decrease in glycogen storage by the liver. Similar research indicates that non-alcoholic fatty liver diseases are also accompanied by a low respiratory quotient value, and the non protein respiratory quotient value was a good indication of disease severity.

Recently the respiratory quotient is also used from aquatic scientists to illuminate its environmental applications. Experimental studies with natural bacterioplankton using different single substrates suggested that RQ is linked to the elemental composition of the respired compounds. By this way, it is demonstrated that bacterioplankton RQ is not only a practical aspect of Bacterioplankton Respiration determination, but also a major ecosystem state variable that provides unique information about aquatic ecosystem functioning. Based on the stoichiometry of the different metabolized substrates, the scientists can predict that dissolved oxygen (O2) and carbon dioxide (CO2) in aquatic ecosystems should covary inversely due to the processing of photosynthesis and respiration. Using this quotient we could shed light on the metabolic behavior and the simultaneous roles of chemical and physical forcing that shape the biogeochemistry of aquatic ecosystems.

Respiratory quotients of some substances

See also

References

External links

Biochemistry methods
Energy conversion
Metabolism
Respiratory physiology
Underwater diving physiology